Manhattan Afternoon is an album by pianist Cedar Walton which was recorded in 1992 and released on the Dutch Criss Cross Jazz label.

Reception

AllMusic rated the album 4 stars.

Track listing 
All compositions by Cedar Walton except as indicated
 "There Is No Greater Love" (Isham Jones, Marty Symes) – 8:57
 "St. Thomas" (Sonny Rollins) – 7:27
 "Skylark" (Hoagy Carmichael, Johnny Mercer) – 7:54
 "The Newest Blues" – 8:07
 "When Love Is New" – 7:20
 "I Mean You" (Thelonious Monk) – 5:35
 "Afternoon in Paris" (John Lewis) – 6:57
 "The Theme" (Miles Davis) – 3:46

Personnel 
Cedar Walton – piano 
David Williams – bass
Billy Higgins – drums

References 

Cedar Walton albums
1994 albums
Criss Cross Jazz albums